Ferrier reaction can refer to two different chemical reactions:

 Ferrier rearrangement
 Ferrier carbocyclization (Ferrier II reaction)